Ruslan Bashkirov  (born March 7, 1989) is a Russian former professional ice hockey player. Bashkirov was most recently a member of Amur Khabarovsk of the Russian KHL. On June 23, 2007, he was drafted in the second round, 60th overall, by the Ottawa Senators in the 2007 NHL Entry Draft held in Columbus, Ohio, but did not sign with Ottawa. He is the twin brother of ice hockey player Roman Bashkirov.

Playing career 
In the 2005–06 season, he played for the HC Spartak Moscow in the Russian Super League. In 2006–07, he was drafted by the Quebec Remparts of the Quebec Major Junior Hockey League. Scouts reported that he has an impressive scoring touch, and they were also impressed with his aggressiveness and competitiveness. Ruslan played with his brother Roman in Quebec. Ruslan was drafted by the Ottawa Senators in the second round of the 2007 Draft but Roman was not. Unable to play together, Ruslan and Roman returned to Russia, where they both played mostly in the Russian minor leagues. Since that time, the Ottawa Senators have not drafted any Russians in the NHL Entry Draft.

Since 2007, Bashkirov has played for Kristall Elektrostal, Khimik Mytischy in 2007–08, and HK Rys and HC Lada Togliatti in 2008–09. He retired in 2016.

Career statistics

Regular season and playoffs

International

Awards and honours

References

External links 

1989 births
Living people
Ice hockey people from Moscow
Amur Khabarovsk players
Atlant Moscow Oblast players
HC Lada Togliatti players
Molot-Prikamye Perm players
Ottawa Senators draft picks
Quebec Remparts players
Russian ice hockey left wingers
Russian twins
Twin sportspeople